Parlons Grand-mère is a Senegalese 1989 short documentary film.

Djibril Diop Mambéty followed and filmed the shooting of Yaaba, Idrissa Ouédraogo's second feature film.

A documentary full of humorous anecdotes regarding the dangers of shooting films in Burkina Faso.

See also
 Cinema of Senegal

External links 

1989 films
1980s short documentary films
1989 documentary films
1989 short films
Documentary films about African cinema
Films shot in Burkina Faso
Senegalese short documentary films